Kurt Van De Wouwer (born 24 September 1971 in Herentals) is a Belgian former professional road bicycle racer who raced between 1993 and 2006. He now works as a directeur sportif for UCI Women's Continental Team .

Major results

1988
 1st  Road race, National Novice Road Championships
1997
 1st Overall Circuito Montañés
 Hofbrau Cup
1st Prologue & Stage 3
 3rd Road race, National Road Championships
2000
 3rd Grand Prix de Wallonie

Grand Tour general classification results timeline

References

External links

1971 births
Living people
Belgian male cyclists
People from Herentals
Cyclists from Antwerp Province
Directeur sportifs